Leptodactylus rugosus is a species of frog in the family Leptodactylidae. It is also known as the Guyana white-lipped frog and the rugose thin-toed frog.

It is found in Guyana, Venezuela, and possibly Brazil. Its natural habitats are subtropical or tropical moist lowland forests, subtropical or tropical moist montane forests, rivers, intermittent rivers, and rocky areas. It is not considered threatened by the IUCN.

References

rugosus
Amphibians described in 1923
Taxonomy articles created by Polbot